Dominic David Fike (born December 30, 1995) is an American singer, songwriter, and actor. Fike first received recognition after releasing several popular songs to the website SoundCloud. Following the release of his debut extended play, Don't Forget About Me, Demos, he signed to Columbia Records.
Fike's song "3 Nights" reached the top ten in multiple countries. He later collaborated with the band Brockhampton and singer Halsey. In June 2020, Fike released the single "Chicken Tenders". In July of the same year, he released the single "Politics & Violence". Fike's debut album, What Could Possibly Go Wrong, was released the same month. The album charted in the top 50 of multiple countries, including the United States and Australia.

In September 2020, Fike became a headliner for a concert series in the video game Fortnite. A few months later, NME included Fike on their list of essential new artists for 2020. He recorded a cover of Paul McCartney's song "The Kiss of Venus" for the album McCartney III Imagined.

In 2022, Fike became a cast member of the second season of Euphoria in his first main acting role, as Elliot.

Early life
Dominic David Fike was born on December 30, 1995, in Naples, Florida. Fike grew up with a younger brother, Alex, a sister, Apollonia (Apple), and an older brother, Sean, and is of African-American, Filipino, and Haitian descent. Fike went to Estero High School and graduated in 2014. Fike was a fan of Jack Johnson, Blink-182 and Red Hot Chili Peppers. He first acquired a guitar at the age of ten and learned how to play songs by the Chili Peppers.

During his childhood, Fike recalled that he and his brothers had to take care of each other owing to his parents' frequent absence from his life. Throughout his childhood, Fike’s mother was in and out of jail, causing him to stay in different homes, including those of his older brother, relatives or his parents' friends. Fike's childhood life was "full of adventure," as he and his friends would spend time in a forested area near their neighborhood that they called the "Forest of Avalon," where he said they would eat snacks and smoke cannabis. He and his older brother Sean would also hang out at the guest house of his friend Stefan’s home, called the "Backhouse," where they would freestyle. Later they coalesced into a formal rap collective that included members Slyte, Ike Lysergic, and Seno. They attracted an audience in the community and Fike formed a sub-group called Lame Boys ENT. In 2015, the group started to attract local media's attention and got booked to music festivals.

Fike started uploading songs on the Internet in high school and the first song he uploaded on YouTube was a song called "Not A Word". He also put songs he recorded into tapes. Fike briefly enrolled in a college but dropped out in less than 3 days.

Career

2017–2018: Don't Forget About Me, Demos
Fike first gained recognition by making beats with his then producer, Hunter Pfeiffer (known as 54) leading to several popular songs on SoundCloud being published. He released the EP Don't Forget About Me, Demos at the age of 22 in October 2018 as a signed artist, which was recorded while he was on house arrest for battery of a police officer. He later went to serve time at Collier County Jail for violating that house arrest. The EP caught the attention of several record labels and sparked a bidding war. During this time, all of Fike’s independently released music prior to the EP was removed from streaming services. After being released back in April 2018, he signed with Columbia for a reported $4 million in August. Fike said the ultimate decision to join a record label was to pay for his mother's lawyer fee, who was facing drug charges at the time.

The EP was released by Columbia on October 16, 2018. "3 Nights" was released as a single the same year. The single gained wide attention and peaked within the top ten of the charts in Australia, Ireland, and the United Kingdom. It had its acoustic guitar sound compared to the music of Jack Johnson. It was placed on rotation on several radio stations and Spotify playlists, and received favorable reviews from outlets such as Rolling Stone, Pitchfork and Billboard. In reference to the EP, Billboard described Fike as a "genre-meshing" artist, and later named him a breakout act to watch, calling "3 Nights" a "Motown-tinged breakout track" that is "trend-proof and irresistible". A music video for the single was released on April 4, 2019 to Fike’s YouTube channel.

2019–present: What Could Possibly Go Wrong
In January 2019, Fike revealed he was working on an album. On April 4, 2019, Brockhampton uploaded a video to their YouTube channel called "This Is Dominic Fike" which featured his single "3 Nights" in it. As of April 2019, multiple collaborations with Brockhampton's Kevin Abstract have been posted. Reaching over 4 million views with their biggest hit being a song called "Peach" off Kevil Abstract's Arizona Baby album.

On June 7, 2019, he released two singles, "Açaí Bowl" and "Rollerblades". He followed these with another single, "Phone Numbers," produced by Kenny Beats, on July 4, 2019. The music video for this song was released on October 15, 2019. Fike announced on July 9, 2019, that he would be going on a tour titled Rain or Shine later in the year. The North American leg of the tour began August 31 in Philadelphia and ended October 3 in Los Angeles. In September 2019, he announced that he would be doing a clothing collaboration with Marc Jacobs. On the fifth day of that month, he performed a song that was unreleased at the time, "Chicken Tenders", at a Chicago concert during his Rain or Shine tour.

Fike is featured on the track "Dominic's Interlude" on Halsey's third album, Manic, which was released on January 17, 2020.

On June 26, 2020, "Chicken Tenders", the first single from his then yet to be named debut album, was released. On July 9, he released the single "Politics & Violence" and announced that his debut album What Could Possibly Go Wrong would be released on July 31.

On August 7, 2020, Fike was the subject of the second episode of The New York Times Presents. In September 2020, Fike became a headliner for the Fortnite concert series. In March 2021, he was featured in the song "Die for You" by Justin Bieber on his sixth studio album Justice.

In August 2021, it was announced that Fike had joined the cast of the HBO teen drama Euphoria for its second season.

Personal life 
The initials of the childhood subgroup "Lame Boys ENT" are tattooed on his forehead. He also has a tattoo of Red Hot Chili Peppers guitarist John Frusciante's face on his right hand.

Discography

Studio albums

Extended plays

Singles

As lead artist

Other charted songs

Guest appearances

Filmography

Television

Awards and nominations

Notes
Notes

References

1995 births
Living people
Singers from Florida
People from Naples, Florida
African-American male rappers
American people of Filipino descent
American musicians of Filipino descent
American rappers of Filipino descent
American musicians of Haitian descent
Filipino people of African-American descent
Alternative hip hop musicians
Rap rock musicians